Dah Chong Hong Holdings Limited (DCH) is a Hong Kong-based conglomerate engaged in motor vehicle sales and repair, air cargo equipment distribution, cosmetic, airport ground support equipment maintenance, food, logistics and warehouse services.

History 
1949: DCH was established, formerly Hang Chong Investment Company Limited and Dah Chong Hong Limited.
1970: Started U.S. Automotive Business in late 1970s and continue to focus on becoming a Great Prosperous Company (Dah Chong Hong).
1991: CITIC Pacific first acquired an approximately 34.86% interest in the company which was an unlisted public company.
1992: CITIC Pacific further acquired the remaining interest in the company making it a wholly owned subsidiary of CITIC Pacific and changed the company’s status from a public company to a private company.
1994: The company was renamed "Dah Chong Hong Holdings Limited".
2007: The company was listed on the Hong Kong Stock Exchange.

DCH Food Mart

Its operating company, DCH Food Mart is one of the leading food retailers in Hong Kong established in 1992. It provides various frozen seafood, meat, poultry, dried seafood and basic groceries sourced globally. It operates over 50 stores in Hong Kong and also 7 branches of its premium specialty store, DCH Food Mart Deluxe. There are currently (estimated) 2 DCH Food Stores and 1 DCH Food Mart Deluxe in Macau.

References

External links

Dah Chong Hong Holdings Limited
 DCH Living 

Companies listed on the Hong Kong Stock Exchange
Conglomerate companies of China
Conglomerate companies established in 1949
CITIC Group
Auto dealerships of China
Conglomerate companies of Hong Kong
Hong Kong
Supermarkets
Supermarkets
1949 establishments in Hong Kong